The Nabesna Road is a minor highway in the U.S. state of Alaska that extends  from the Slana River to Nabesna, providing access to some interior components of Wrangell-St. Elias National Park. The entire length of the road is gravel and has few services. Flat tires and washouts are fairly common along the entire length of the road.

Route description

Today, the Alaska Department of Transportation maintains the Nabesna Road and, generally, the road is passable by most two-wheel drive vehicles. However, higher clearance and/or four-wheel drive are occasionally needed beyond Mile 29 due to stream crossings. Wet conditions such as spring run-off and heavy rain can make these stream crossings impassable. The maintained portion of the road ends at a private hunting lodge at mile 42. The last four miles (6 km) of the road are not maintained and may be deeply rutted and wet. Vehicle travel on this portion of the road is not recommended.

The Slana Roadhouse, a historic site dating to 1928, is located on Nabesna Road in Slana.

Motorists may stop at the Slana Ranger Station, mile .5, to check current road conditions and to pick up a Nabesna Road Guide brochure.

History
The Nabesna Road was originally built in 1933 by the Alaska Road Commission to supply Nabesna Mine and to ship out its ore.

Major intersections

See also 
Slana Roadhouse

References

External links

Official NPS site
World Heritage Site

Copper River Census Area, Alaska
Gravel roads
State highways in Alaska
Transportation in Unorganized Borough, Alaska